Kutiah Lungma Glacier is a 12 km long and  3 km wide glacier in Karakorum mountain ranges in Stak Valley of District Skardu, Gilgit-Baltistan, Pakistan.  It is located in a valley, Stak Valley (sometimes also referred to as Staq), which is in the subdivision Roundu of district Skardu Gilgit-Baltistan. The glacier is in the north of Nanga Parbat (the ninth highest peak of the world), about 20 kilometers away from the northern bank of the Indus River. One can access the glacier from June–September from Skardu or Gilgit city, as it is about 10 km away from the Gilgit-Skardu road. An un-metalled road from Gilgit-Skardu Road at the junction of Indus River and Stak Valley stream leads to the base camp of the glacier.

History 
Kutiah Lungma Glacier has a long history and it has a story related to it, some call it fictional but some believe that it had happened. The story reads; The Stak Valley in the past was the headquarter of the Subdivision Roundu, as at the time there was no road network and the valley was fertile and the biggest valley in the subdivision. There was a king named "Rong Lonchay" who had six daughters. The youngest daughter was Apino. The king had distributed his wealth and the assets among the daughters before his death. As Apino was the youngest and most loved one, therefore he had given away the biggest and the fertile valley of Stak to the Apino. She lived in the Stak Valley and in the last ages she had lost her eye sight. Once a local resident misconducted her by presenting her with a dunk cake pretending to be a cookie. She looked offended and cursed on the residents, praying the God to vanish the valley and send his calamity and adversity on them. She left the valley and the glacier started expanding downward towards the inhabited areas. It is said that the area which is now covered by the glacier was once a fertile area and fully covered by human settlements. Now the whole area is covered by the glacier and there is nothing except huge reserve of ice and rocks.

Climatic effect on surging and retreat 
The glacier had advanced about 12.8 kilometers in 1955 towards the populated area within 91 days.  The glacier was advancing at a staggering rate of just over a mile every month, 15 feet every hour and had devoured acres of pastureland. The local elders still tell the story of the glacier's advancing towards the pastureland. According to the elders the glacier advanced at a very noticeable rate i.e. the glacier would first grow vertically and then suddenly fall flat. Within months the glacier had reached at the first hamlet and people were very concerned that the whole Stak Valley would be devoured by the glacier if it didn't retreat. People also relate it with an indigenous logic that the glaciers also have gender and the Kutia Lungma Glacier was female and it was advancing to meet its male counterpart i.e. the glacier in the opposite Ganji Valley across the Indus River. People believe that it was real. The elders tell that they brought pieces of ice from the other glacier which they thought to be male and dropped the ice pieces on the Kutia Liungma Glacier. Along with people arranged rituals and prayed the god to save them from the glacier advancing. Within two to three years the glacier retreated about 4-5 kilometers. Now the glacier is about 4-5 kilometers uphill from the last village of Stak Valley which is known as Tookla Village.

See also 

 Baltoro Glacier
 Haramosh Peak
 Godwin-Austen Glacier
 Sarpo Laggo Glacier
 Eight-thousander
 List of highest mountains
 List of glaciers
 Laila Peak

References 

Skardu District
Glaciers of Gilgit-Baltistan
Glaciers of the Karakoram
China–Pakistan border